Agnes Steele (August 22, 1881 – March 3, 1949) was an American actress. She appeared in 13 films between 1926 and 1949.

She died at her home and was buried in Calvary Cemetery's mausoleum in Los Angeles on March 8, 1949.

Selected filmography
My Old Dutch (1926)
You're Darn Tootin' (1928)
Roaring Ranch (1930)

References

External links

1881 births
1949 deaths
American film actresses
American silent film actresses
20th-century American actresses